Jean de Koven (1915 - 23 July, 1937) was an American ballet dancer and dance tutor from Boston, Massachusetts who was murdered in Paris, France in July 1937. 

She had been staying with her aunt, Ida Sackheim, in a hotel on the Left Bank, where she disappeared on the afternoon of 23 July

Her body was discovered beneath the front porch of a villa at La Celle-Saint-Cloud on 8 December 1937. De Koven was the first of six victims of German-born serial killer Eugen Weidmann, also known as "Karrer", a gang leader who confessed to his crimes and had as many as nine accomplices.

Resolution of crime
De Koven, resided in Brooklyn, New York before going abroad. She taught classical dancing and had trained ballet students in New Jersey schools. She arrived in Normandy on July 19. Before vanishing De Koven was corresponding with a man who resided in another hotel in Paris from which he later moved away. On the afternoon of her disappearance she took her camera and told her aunt that she would return by 8pm, in time to go to the opera.

Sackheim received a letter requesting $500 for her niece's safe return, which police investigated. Later ransom notes arrived and she received mysterious telephone calls. Police could not locate the contact man even though he advertised frequently in the Paris edition of an American newspaper. By September Sackheim offered a reward requesting information which would lead to the finding of De Koven's presumed abductors.

Police found De Koven's body doubled up in a shallow grave under a porch. Weidmann's other victims were realtor named Raymond Lesobre, theatrical producer Roger LeBlond, a chauffeur Joseph Couffy, and a young German he met in jail Fritz Frommer, and private nurse Janine Keller. LeBlond was lured to his car by one of two female "decoys", where he was killed at Neuilly.

Killer's profile
Weidmann murdered De Koven in July 1937. A native of Frankfurt, Germany, he came to Paris the previous March to avoid military service. In 1926, at the age of 18, he emigrated to Canada where he joined a gang that robbed a wheat company's paymaster in Saskatchewan. He was sentenced to a year in prison and was later deported. Weidmann served prison time in Frankfurt for assault and robbery before he was released in December 1936.

Weidmann and his helpers preyed on people who appeared wealthy, mainly American and English tourists. It is thought that he met De Koven while he was working as an interpreter
at the Paris Exhibition. He spoke English and French fluently. Police traced him to an expensive dance bar, the Pavillon Bleu, in La Celle-Saint-Cloud, about a 15-minute walk from his villa. Weidmann strangled his victims or shot them from behind. He apparently had a fetish for men's shoes, as the four men he murdered were found shoeless.

Funeral
A funeral service was held for De Koven in the West End Funeral Chapel, 200 West 91st Street, in New York City, on December 31, 1937. Rabbi I. Mortimer Bloom, minister at Temple Oheb Sholom, performed the ceremony. Bloom knew De Koven from her youth and remarked "there was something fine, distinctive, and superior about Jean, even in her childhood." She is buried in Mount Carmel Cemetery, Queens, New York.

Book about the murder of Jean de Koven
Beaux Ténèbres, la Pulsion du Mal d'Eugène Weidmann by Michel Ferracci-Porri, 412 p.(Ed. Normant, 2008 France) 

Comments on Cain by F. Tennyson Jesse (New York: Collier Books; London: Collier-Macmillan, Ltd., 1948, 1964), 158p., p. 99-158, Eugen Weidmann: A Study in Brouhaha.  There is a drawing of Weidmann at the front of the book.

External links
Time Magazine Story 20 December 1937
Life Magazine Story 3 January 1938 (pp. 52–53)

References

American female dancers
Dancers from Massachusetts
People from Boston
American expatriates in France
1915 births
1937 deaths
American people murdered abroad
People murdered in Paris
Victims of serial killers
Murdered American Jews
20th-century American women
20th-century American people
1930s murders in Paris
1937 murders in France